is a Japanese keyboardist who was born in Tokyo's Minato ward.

Personal History
In the late 1980s and early '90s, he worked as a support member for The Blue Hearts and played the keyboard for them on their tours. After The Blue Hearts broke up, Shirai joined with the band's two lead members, Hiroto Kōmoto and Masatoshi Mashima, to form a new group, The High-Lows, in 1995.

Shirai left The High-Lows in 2003. While embarking on a solo career, he also joined with a third former member of The Blue Hearts, Tetsuya Kajiwara, to form another band, The Big Hip.

References

External links
Mikio Shirai Official Site

1950 births
Living people
Japanese keyboardists
The Blue Hearts members
Musicians from Tokyo